The Black Banner or Black Standard (also known as  ("banner of the eagle" or simply as , , "the banner") is one of the flags flown by the Islamic prophet Muhammad according to Muslim tradition. It was historically used by Abu Muslim in his uprising leading to the Abbasid Revolution in 747 and is therefore associated with the Abbasid Caliphate in particular. It is also a symbol in Islamic eschatology (heralding the advent of the Mahdi).

The Black Banner, which is distinct from the ISIS flag, has been used by some jihadist and other militant groups since the 1990s, including some Chechen groups. Scholars have interpreted IS's use of a similar black flag as representing their claim to re-establishing a Caliphate. Similar black flags have been used throughout Islamic history, including in Afghanistan during the early 20th century.

Origin

The Roman army used visible standards, Eagles, to identify the core of its legions. By the mid-600s, Arab armies were using standards for the same purpose.

Islamic tradition states that the Quraysh had a black  and a white-and-black . This larger flag was known as  Eagle.

The hadith reports Muhammad said that the advent of the Mahdi would be signalled by Black Standards proceeding from Khorasan and that it will be the flag of the army that will fight the Masih ad-Dajjal.

Historical use
The Abbasid Revolution against the Umayyad Caliphate adopted black for its  for which their partisans were called the s. Their rivals chose other colours in reaction; among these, forces loyal to Marwan II adopted red. The choice of black as the colour of the Abbasid Revolution was already motivated by the "black standards out of Khorasan" tradition associated with the Mahdi. The contrast of white vs. black as the Fatimid vs. Abbasid dynastic colour over time developed in white as the colour of Shia Islam and black as the colour of Sunni Islam. After the revolution, Islamic apocalyptic circles admitted that the Abbasid banners would be black but asserted that the Mahdi's standard would be black and larger. Anti-Abbasid circles cursed "the black banners from the East", "first and last".
A black flag was used by the Hotak dynasty in the early 18th century, following Mirwais Hotak's Sunni rebellion against the Twelver Shi'i Safavid dynasty and later by the Emirate of Afghanistan under Abdur Rahman Khan (1880–1901).
On 21 July 1848, under orders from the Báb, the Bábí leader Mullá Husayn raised the Black Standard in Mashhad (in Iran's Khorasan Province) and began a march westwards. The mission was most likely proclamatory but possibly also to rescue another Bábí leader, Quddús, who was under house arrest in Sárí. After being rebuffed at the town of Barfurush, the group took up making defensive fortifications at the Shrine of Shaykh Tabarsi. It is reported the Black Standard flew above the Bábí fortress until the end of the Battle of Fort Tabarsi. According to Denis MacEoin, the Babis under Boshru'i were on their mission of spreading Babism, "by preaching if possible, by force if necessary."
As Arab nationalism developed in the early 20th century, the black within the Pan-Arab colors was chosen to represent the Abbasid dynastic color.
The Ahmadiyya movement also employs black and white colours in its flag, first hoisted in 1939. Mirza Tahir Ahmad, the fourth caliph of the Ahmadiyya Caliphate, explained the symbolism of the colours black and white in terms of the concept of revelation and prophethood.

Jihadist black flag

See also

 Black Banner Organization
 Christian flag
 Islamic flags
 Jihadist flag
 List of black flags
 Tawhid
 Black Flag of Anarchism

References

Citations

Works cited

External links

 Collection of imagery of black flags used in Islamic extremism
 The Black Flag (al-raya) at The Islamic Imagery Project, The Combating Terrorism Center at West Point
 The Semiotics of a Black Flag (makingsenseofjihad.com)
 Usama Hasan, The Black Flags of Khurasan (unity1.wordpress.com)

Abbasid Caliphate
Standard, Black
Flags representing the Shahada
Islamic eschatology
Islamic symbols
Islamic terminology
Islamism
Jihadism
Religious flags
Religious symbols